Carl Michael Alfred Steinberg (4 October 1928 – 26 July 2009) was an American music critic and author who specializes in classical music. He was best known, according to San Francisco Chronicle music critic Joshua Kosman, for "the illuminating, witty and often deeply personal notes he wrote for the San Francisco Symphony's program booklets, beginning in 1979." He contributed several entries to the New Grove Dictionary of Music and Musicians, wrote articles for music journals and magazine, notes for CDs, and published a number of books on music, both collected published annotations and new writings.

Life and career
Born in Breslau, Germany (now Wrocław, Poland), Steinberg left Germany in 1939 as one of the Kindertransport child refugees and spent four years in England. He immigrated to the United States in 1943 with his brother and mother and earned a degree in musicology from Princeton University (the classical-music scholar and pianist Charles Rosen was his roommate). After Princeton, he lived two years in Italy on a Fulbright scholarship, followed by a two-year stint in Germany with the U.S. Army. Once this posting ended, he became a faculty member of the Manhattan School of Music, where he taught music history.

Steinberg taught at several colleges in New York and Massachusetts before he became music critic for the Boston Globe in 1964. His time with the Globe was not without controversy. While Steinberg was lauded for his writing, the high standards by which he gauged the performances he reviewed caused friction with the Boston Symphony Orchestra. At one time, the orchestra's members voted to ban Steinberg from attending its concerts. However, after almost 12 years with the Globe, he became program annotator for this orchestra. In 1979, he worked as publications director and artistic advisor for the San Francisco Symphony; he stayed until 1989. He was program annotator for a number of other orchestras during his career, including the New York Philharmonic and the Minnesota Orchestra, the latter of which he served as artistic advisor during the 1990s.

In a 1995 interview with the San Francisco Chronicle, Steinberg said he saw his role as a critic and annotator as someone "building bridges and helping to create contact between listeners—nonprofessional listeners for the most part—and music."

Steinberg died in Edina, Minnesota, at the age of 80.

Selected publications

Books

Grove articles
Grove Music Online. Oxford: Oxford University Press. 2001

References

External links
 Interview with Steinberg on WFIU

1928 births
2009 deaths
American music critics
Manhattan School of Music faculty
Princeton University alumni
Kindertransport refugees
Jewish American writers
Jewish emigrants from Nazi Germany to the United States
20th-century American Jews
21st-century American Jews
The Boston Globe people
Fulbright alumni